Diana Wynne Jones (16 August 1934 – 26 March 2011) was a British novelist, poet, academic, literary critic, and short story writer. She principally wrote fantasy and speculative fiction novels for children and young adults. Although usually described as fantasy, some of her work also incorporates science fiction themes and elements of realism. Jones's work often explores themes of time travel and parallel or multiple universes. Some of her better-known works are the Chrestomanci series, the Dalemark series, the three Moving Castle novels, Dark Lord of Derkholm, and The Tough Guide to Fantasyland.

Jones has been cited as an inspiration and muse for several fantasy and science fiction authors including Philip Pullman, Terry Pratchett, Penelope Lively, Robin McKinley, Dina Rabinovitch, Megan Whalen Turner, J.K. Rowling and Neil Gaiman, with Gaiman describing her as "quite simply the best writer for children of her generation". Her work has been nominated for several awards. She was twice a finalist for the Hugo Award, nominated fourteen times for the Locus Award, seven times for the Mythopoeic Award (which she won twice), twice for a British Fantasy Award (won in 1999), and twice for a World Fantasy Award, which she won in 2007.

Early life and marriage

Jones was born in London, the daughter of Marjorie (née Jackson) and Richard Aneurin Jones, both of whom were teachers. When war was announced, shortly after her fifth birthday, she was evacuated to Wales, and thereafter moved several times, including periods in the Lake District, in York, and back in London. In 1943 her family finally settled in Thaxted, Essex, where her parents worked running an educational conference centre. There, Jones and her two younger sisters Isobel (later Professor Isobel Armstrong, the literary critic) and Ursula (later an actress and a children's writer) spent a childhood left chiefly to their own devices.

After attending Friends' School, Saffron Walden, she studied English at St Anne's College in Oxford, where she attended lectures by both C. S. Lewis and J. R. R. Tolkien before graduating in 1956. In the same year she married John Burrow, a prominent scholar of medieval literature, with whom she had three sons, Richard, Michael and Colin. After a brief period in London, in 1957 the couple returned to Oxford, where they stayed until moving to Bristol in 1976.

Career
Jones started writing during the mid-1960s "mostly to keep [her] sanity", when the youngest of her three children was about two years old and the family lived in a house owned by an Oxford college. Besides the children, she felt harried by the crises of adults in the household: a sick husband, a mother-in-law, a sister, and a friend with daughter. Her first book was a novel for adults published by Macmillan in 1970, entitled Changeover. It originated as the British Empire was divesting colonies; she recalled in 2004 that it had "seemed like every month, we would hear that yet another small island or tiny country had been granted independence." Changeover is set in a fictional African colony during transition, and what begins as a memo about the problem of how to "mark changeover" ceremonially is misunderstood to be about the threat of a terrorist named Mark Changeover. It is a farce with a large cast of characters, featuring government, police, and army bureaucracies; sex, politics, and news. In 1965, when Rhodesia declared independence unilaterally (one of the last colonies and not tiny), "I felt as if the book were coming true as I wrote it."

Jones's books range from amusing slapstick situations to sharp social observation (Changeover is both), to witty parody of literary forms. Foremost amongst the latter are The Tough Guide To Fantasyland and its fictional companion-piece Dark Lord of Derkholm, which provide a merciless (though not unaffectionate) critique of formulaic sword-and-sorcery epics.

The Harry Potter books are frequently compared to the works of Diana Wynne Jones. Many of her earlier children's books were out of print in recent years, but have now been re-issued for the young audience whose interest in fantasy and reading was spurred by Harry Potter.

Jones's works are also compared to those of Robin McKinley and Neil Gaiman. She was friends with both McKinley and Gaiman, and Jones and Gaiman were fans of each other's work; she dedicated her 1993 novel Hexwood to him after something he said in conversation inspired a key part of the plot. Gaiman had already dedicated his 1991 four-part comic book mini-series The Books of Magic to "four witches", of whom Jones was one.

For Charmed Life, the first Chrestomanci novel, Jones won the 1978 Guardian Children's Fiction Prize, a once-in-a-lifetime award by The Guardian newspaper that is judged by a panel of children's writers. Three times she was a commended runner-up for the Carnegie Medal from the Library Association, recognising the year's best children's book: for Dogsbody (1975), Charmed Life (1977), and the fourth Chrestomanci book The Lives of Christopher Chant (1988). She won the Mythopoeic Fantasy Award, children's section, in 1996 for The Crown of Dalemark (concluding that series) and in 1999 for Dark Lord of Derkholm; in four other years she was a finalist for that annual literary award by the Mythopoeic Society.

The 1986 novel Howl's Moving Castle was inspired by a boy at a school she was visiting, who asked her to write a book called The Moving Castle. It was published first by Greenwillow in the U.S., where it was a runner-up for the annual Boston Globe–Horn Book Award in children's fiction. In 2004, Hayao Miyazaki made the Japanese-language animated movie Howl's Moving Castle, which was nominated for the Academy Award for Best Animated Feature. A version dubbed in English was released in the UK and US in 2005, with the voice of Howl performed by Christian Bale. Next year Jones and the novel won the annual Phoenix Award from the Children's Literature Association, recognising the best children's book published twenty years earlier that did not win a major award (named for mythical bird phoenix to suggest the book's rise from obscurity).

Fire and Hemlock had been the 2005 Phoenix runner-up. It is a novel based on Scottish ballads, and was a Mythopoeic Fantasy finalist in its own time.

Archer's Goon (1984) was a runner-up for that year's Horn Book Award. It was adapted for television in 1992. One Jones fansite believes it to be "the only tv adaptation (so far) of one of Diana's books".

Jones's book on clichés in fantasy fiction, The Tough Guide To Fantasyland (nonfiction), has a cult following among writers and critics, despite initially being difficult to find due to an erratic printing history. It was reissued in the UK, and has been reissued in the United States in 2006 by Firebird Books. The Firebird edition has additional material and a completely new design, including a new map.

The British Fantasy Society recognised her significant impact on fantasy with its Karl Edward Wagner Award in 1999. She received an honorary D.Litt from the University of Bristol in July 2006 and the World Fantasy Award for Life Achievement in 2007.

In August 2014, Google commemorated Jones with a Google Doodle created by Google artist Sophie Diao.

Illness and death

Jones was diagnosed with lung cancer in the early summer of 2009. She underwent surgery in July and reported to friends that the procedure had been successful. However, in June 2010 she announced that she would be discontinuing chemotherapy because it only made her feel ill. In mid-2010 she was halfway through a new book with plans for another to follow. She died on 26 March 2011 from the disease. She was surrounded by her husband, three sons, and five grandchildren as she was cremated at Canford Cemetery.

The story in progress when she became too ill to write, The Islands of Chaldea, was completed by her sister Ursula Jones in 2014.
Interviewed by The Guardian in June 2013 after she finished the Chaldea story, Ursula Jones said that "other things were coming to light ... She left behind a mass of stuff." In 2013 another book was published posthumously, Vile Visitors.

Works

Selected awards and honours
Jones has been nominated for and also won multiple awards for her various works.

Explanatory notes

References

Citations

Additional works cited
  
   Formerly The Official Diana Wynne Jones Fansite.

Further reading

External links

 
 The Diana Wynne Jones fansite—fan-operated but approved by Jones who also participated
 "Diana Wynne Jones", entry in The Encyclopedia of Science Fiction
 
 Diana Wynne Jones at SciFan
 
 "Wrestling with an Angel" (2003), based on an interview with BBC Bristol
 

1934 births
2011 deaths
20th-century British short story writers
20th-century English novelists
20th-century English women writers
Alumni of St Anne's College, Oxford
British women short story writers
British parodists
Parody novelists
British writers of young adult literature
Deaths from lung cancer in England
English atheists
English children's writers
English fantasy writers
English women novelists
Guardian Children's Fiction Prize winners
People educated at Friends School Saffron Walden
People from Thaxted
Women science fiction and fantasy writers
Women writers of young adult literature
World Fantasy Award-winning writers